Mortality forecasting refers to the art and science of determining likely future mortality rates.  It is especially important in rich countries with a high proportion of aged people, since aged populations are expensive in terms of pensions (both public and private).  It is a major topic in Ageing studies.

See also

 Lee-Carter model
 Life expectancy
 Actuarial science

Actuarial science
Death
Forecasting